Denis Mojstrovič (born 17 October 1986) is a retired Slovenian footballer who played as a midfielder.

References

External links
PrvaLiga profile 

1986 births
Living people
Sportspeople from Novo Mesto
Slovenian footballers
Association football midfielders
NK Krka players
NK Ivančna Gorica players
Slovenian Second League players
Slovenian PrvaLiga players